M'Daourouch is a district in Souk Ahras Province, Algeria. It was named after its capital, M'Daourouch.

Municipalities
The district is further divided into 3 municipalities:
M'Daourouch
Tiffech 
Ragouba

Districts of Souk Ahras Province